James Evans is an American political executive and businessman who served as Chair of the Utah Republican Party from 2013 to 2017, the first African-American to serve in the role. Evans previously served as the first African-American Utah State Senator.

Early life and education 
Evans was born and raised in Orangeburg, South Carolina. He graduated from Orangeburg-Wilkinson High School before earning a Bachelor of Science in Chemical Engineering from Tuskegee University.

Career 
Evans served in the United States Air Force, reaching the rank of captain. He owned a payday lending franchise called Chekline. Evans served as a member of the Utah State Senate from 2002 to 2004, representing the 1st district.

After serving as Chair of the Utah Republican Party for four years, Evans was defeated for re-appointment and succeeded by Rob Anderson. Evans had faced mounting pressure to resign amid a lawsuit against his business and growing financial debts.

References

Living people
African-American state legislators in Utah
Republican Party Utah state senators
People from Salt Lake County, Utah
State political party chairs of Utah
United States Air Force officers
Businesspeople from Utah
Orangeburg-Wilkinson High School alumni
Tuskegee University alumni
1962 births
21st-century African-American people
20th-century African-American people